Lane is a town in Williamsburg County, South Carolina, United States. The population was 508 at the 2010 census.

Lane is a predominately black town.

Geography
Lane is located at  (33.525346, -79.879560).

Lane is located about an hour's drive from Charleston and the Atlantic Ocean.

Demographics

As of the census of 2000, there were 585 people, 223 households, and 148 families residing in the town. The population density was 147.4 people per square mile (56.9/km2). There were 256 housing units at an average density of 64.5 per square mile (24.9/km2). The racial makeup of the town was 9.23% White, 90.43% African American, and 0.34% from two or more races. Hispanic or Latino of any race were 0.68% of the population.

There were 223 households, out of which 30.0% had children under the age of 18 living with them, 33.6% were married couples living together, 28.3% had a female householder with no husband present, and 33.6% were non-families. 30.9% of all households were made up of individuals, and 13.9% had someone living alone who was 65 years of age or older. The average household size was 2.62 and the average family size was 3.35.

In the town, the population was spread out, with 29.1% under the age of 18, 8.5% from 18 to 24, 23.8% from 25 to 44, 23.1% from 45 to 64, and 15.6% who were 65 years of age or older. The median age was 35 years. For every 100 females, there were 79.4 males. For every 100 females age 18 and over, there were 73.6 males.

The median income for a household in the town was $19,659, and the median income for a family was $28,472. Males had a median income of $21,635 versus $15,000 for females. The per capita income for the town was $9,963. About 30.9% of families and 33.2% of the population were below the poverty line, including 42.8% of those under age 18 and 26.4% of those age 65 or over.

History and facts
Lane, a farming community between the Santee and Black River Basins, was established in 1856.

The town is bisected by the main north–south CSX Transportation line. Located in a rural setting, Lane is situated a short distance southeast of the intersection of US Highways 52 and 521. The water, provided by a modern municipal water system from ground water sources, was named the best drinking water by the SC Rural Water Association in 1990.

References

External links
Information on the Town of Lane from Williamsburg County

Towns in South Carolina
Towns in Williamsburg County, South Carolina